Alexander Nikitich Panshin (1863–1904) was a Russian speed skater and figure skater.

Career
In 1889, he won the unofficial World speed skating title. He won several European Championship titles. He was the first Russian champion in figure skating, winning titles from 1897 to 1900.

Results

References

https://web.archive.org/web/20110725122306/http://www.engis.ru/isugrandprix01/history/history.html
Russia's First Olympic Victor 
Tribal Identities Google Books source

1863 births
1904 deaths
People from Sestroretsk
Russian male single skaters
Russian male speed skaters
Sportspeople from Saint Petersburg
1904 suicides
Suicides in Russia